The Legally Prohibited from Being Funny on Television Tour (also known as the Prohibited Tour) was a comedy tour by American comedian and talk show host Conan O'Brien. Its title is a reference to the 2010 Tonight Show host and timeslot conflict, which resulted in O'Brien resigning from his position as host of The Tonight Show in January 2010. O'Brien reached a settlement with NBC that barred him from appearing on television until September 2010, but it did not bar him from performing before a live audience in a concert setting. From April through June 2010, O'Brien performed 43 shows in the United States and Canada.

O'Brien announced on March 11, 2010, via his Twitter account that he would embark on a 30-city live tour beginning April 12. Even with the unconventional marketing campaign of a single Twitter announcement, many locations sold out within hours of the tweet and additional shows were added on to meet demand. During the tour, O'Brien announced that his new show, Conan, would debut on TBS in November 2010. A documentary following O'Brien during the tour, Conan O'Brien Can't Stop, was released in June 2011.

Background and announcement

In January 2010, late-night talk show hosts Conan O'Brien and Jay Leno engaged in a public relations conflict over who should host The Tonight Show. Due to low ratings for The Jay Leno Show and The Tonight Show with Conan O'Brien, NBC announced a schedule change, moving Leno from 10:00 pm to 11:30 pm, and O'Brien from 11:30 pm to 12:00 am. This change resulted in a public outcry and public demonstrations largely in support of O'Brien. O'Brien indicated that he would quit his show and leave the network if NBC were to implement it, citing the "destruction" of the venerable franchise which had aired at or around 11:30 pm for over 60 years.

As part of the deal between O'Brien and NBC, O'Brien was legally prohibited from appearing on television prior to September 1, 2010. He began to utilize social media to remain engaged with his fan base. O'Brien started a Twitter account on February 24, 2010. After about one hour, O'Brien's subscriber list had reached over 30,000 members and, approximately 30 minutes later, he was on the brink of passing 50,000 followers. After 24 hours, O'Brien had well over 300,000 followers. In late May 2010, he surpassed the one million mark for number of Twitter followers.

O'Brien announced via his Twitter account that he would embark on a 30-city live tour on March 11, 2010, beginning on April 12, 2010. On the same day, teamcoco.com, an official website, was launched. According to TMZ, O'Brien decided not to keep any of the proceeds from the tour, in order to employ his show's staff members.

Format

Several members of O'Brien's staff joined him for the tour, including sidekick Andy Richter, and the former Tonight Show Band, temporarily renamed "The Legally Prohibited Band". Max Weinberg, the band leader, was unable to participate in the tour due to his recent heart surgery, although he did appear at one of the New York City shows.

Signs at each venue encouraged audience members using Twitter during the show to use a unique hashtag. Reggie Watts served as the tour's opening act. In the video introduction to the show, Conan appeared as an obese and bearded version of himself struggling to cope with the loss of his talk show while Eric Carmen's "All By Myself" plays. He then transforms back into his thin self during his exercise montage (by merely pulling off his body suit) after getting the call to go on tour.

The tour differed from his television shows in that there was no desk or celebrity interviews, but presented as more of a variety show than a stand-up routine. Many elements from TV were incorporated into the show, including video bits, musical and comic performers, and cameo appearances by celebrities. Classic sketches were also revived for the tour, albeit under different names due to legal issues over the ownership rights. The Masturbating Bear, for example, made a brief appearance before being transformed into the Self-Pleasuring Panda. Also, the "Walker, Texas Ranger lever" was retitled the "Chuck Norris Rural Policeman Handle". Triumph the Insult Comic Dog mocked the city the tour was appearing in as himself in a prerecorded bit that inserts information about the city by dubbing over the original audio. O'Brien also introduced a giant inflatable bat he claimed to have purchased during Meat Loaf's Bat Out of Hell tour and at one point walked onstage wearing a replica of Eddie Murphy's purple suit from his comedy special Eddie Murphy Raw. In addition, O'Brien performed music throughout the show, including the disco hit "I Will Survive" and a personal parody of "On the Road Again".

Opening act
Reggie Watts (select dates)

Special guests

Spoon (Eugene)
Jack McBrayer (Eugene, Los Angeles, Atlanta)
Seth Rogen (Vancouver—April 14)
Dave Matthews (Seattle—April 18)
Eddie Vedder (Seattle—April 19)
Mike McCready (Seattle—April 19)
Chris Isaak (San Francisco)
Jim Carrey (Los Angeles)
Aziz Ansari (Los Angeles)
Jonah Hill (Los Angeles)
Jon Hamm (Los Angeles—April 24)
Seth Green (Los Angeles—April 25) 
Sarah Silverman (Los Angeles—April 25)
Jason Mraz (San Diego)
Mike Tyson (Las Vegas—May 2)
The Fray (Denver)
Jimmie Vaughan (Dallas)
Dirk Nowitzki (Dallas)
Charlie Sexton (Austin)
Hanson (Tulsa)
Jason Sudeikis (Kansas City)
Brian Setzer (Minneapolis)
Brian Urlacher (Chicago—May 19)
John C. Reilly (Chicago—May 19)
Lil' Ed Williams (Chicago—May 20)
Tim Meadows (Chicago—May 20)
Sarah Killen (East Lansing)
Kid Rock (East Lansing)
John Krasinski (New York City)
Stephen Colbert (New York City—June 1)
Jon Stewart (New York City—June 1)
Paul Rudd (New York City—June 1)
Bill Hader (New York City—June 1)
Vampire Weekend (New York City—June 1)
Max Weinberg (New York City—June 2)
Pee-wee Herman (New York City—June 2)
Eli Manning (New York City—June 2)
Dropkick Murphys (Boston)
Ed Helms (Boston—June 4)
Tina Fey (Upper Darby)
Trey Anastasio (Upper Darby)
Jack White (Nashville)
Evander Holyfield (Atlanta)

Tour dates

Festivals and other miscellaneous performances
This show is a part of the "Bonnaroo Music Festival"

Box office score data

Response
Just hours before the first show of the tour, O'Brien announced that he would host a new show on cable station TBS, titled Conan, which debuted in November 2010. In addition to the announcement of the television series, TBS also announced a one-hour TBS Special, featuring several writers for Conan, as well Watts.

Even with ticket prices starting at $40, The Legally Prohibited from Being Funny on Television Tour sold out. Footage of O'Brien's tour has been uploaded onto YouTube by fans in attendance and immediately went viral. A clip of O'Brien's performance of "I Will Survive", for example, has received more than 320,000 views.

Conan O'Brien Can't Stop, a behind-the-scenes documentary film shot during the tour, was released in June 2011. It focuses on the production of the tour, O'Brien's interactions with fans and his crew, and O'Brien's thoughts on the Tonight Show conflict and legal injunction that inspired the tour. The movie was filmed, directed and produced by director Rodman Flender, a college friend of O'Brien.

Notes
 Sarah Killen was chosen at random to be O'Brien's one follow on Twitter.
 O'Brien performed two shows at the Borgata on May 30, 2010.

References

External links
Legally Prohibited Tour on Team Coco Website

2010 in American television
2010 in theatre
2010 Tonight Show conflict
Comedy tours
Conan O'Brien